The Glen Canyon Covered Bridge, near Santa Cruz, California, was a covered bridge built in 1892.  It was listed on the National Register of Historic Places in 1984.  It has since been demolished.

It was a single Howe truss span protected by a shake roof and vertical siding, built by G.H. McKay at cost of $1,145.

It has also been known as Delaveaga Covered Bridge. It brought Glen Canyon Road over Branciforte Creek.

References

Covered bridges in California
National Register of Historic Places in Santa Cruz County, California
Infrastructure completed in 1892